The Euganei (fr. Lat. Euganei, Euganeorum; cf. Gr. εὐγενής (eugenēs) 'well-born') were a semi-mythical Proto-Italic ethnic group that dwelt an area among Adriatic Sea and Rhaetian Alps. Subsequently, they were driven by the Adriatic Veneti to an area between the river Adige and Lake Como, where they remained until the early Roman Empire.

They may have been a Pre-Indo-European people, ethnically related to the Ingauni, as suggested by the similarity of the names. According to Pliny the Elder the Stoni people from Trentino were of the same stock as the Euganei.

Cato the Elder, in the lost book of Origines, counted among the major tribes of the Euganeans the Triumplini of Val Trompia and the Camunni of Val Camonica.

According to Livy, they were defeated by the Adriatic Veneti and the Trojans. Their descendants settled west of the Athesis (Adige) river, around the lakes Sebinus, Edrus and Benacus, where they occupied 34 towns, which were admitted by Augustus to the rights of Latin municipalities.

References

Bibliography

External links 
 Livy, Ab urbe condita, 1:1
 Veneto history
 Italian Peninsula

See also 
 Ancient peoples of Italy
 Polada culture

Ancient peoples of Italy